Abbas Pasha may refer to:
 Abbas I of Egypt (1812–1854), ruler of Egypt from November 1848 to July 1854
 Abbas II of Egypt (1874–1944), khedive of Egypt from January 8, 1892, to 1914